Gabriel Altamirano Tames (born 24 May 1946 in Mexico City) is a Mexican former swimmer who competed in the 1964 Summer Olympics and in the 1968 Summer Olympics.

References

External links
 

1946 births
Living people
Mexican male swimmers
Swimmers from Mexico City
Male butterfly swimmers
Olympic swimmers of Mexico
Swimmers at the 1964 Summer Olympics
Swimmers at the 1968 Summer Olympics
Central American and Caribbean Games gold medalists for Mexico
Competitors at the 1962 Central American and Caribbean Games
Competitors at the 1966 Central American and Caribbean Games
Central American and Caribbean Games medalists in swimming